The 1952 Cork Intermediate Hurling Championship was the 43rd staging of the Cork Intermediate Hurling Championship since its establishment by the Cork County Board in 1909.

Bandon won the championship following a 1-05 to 1-02 defeat of St. Finbarr's in the final. This was their first ever championship title in the grade.

References

Cork Intermediate Hurling Championship
Cork Intermediate Hurling Championship